The Dallas Museum of Art (DMA) is an art museum located in the Arts District of downtown Dallas, Texas, along Woodall Rodgers Freeway between St. Paul and Harwood. In the 1970s, the museum moved from its previous location in Fair Park to the Arts District. The new building was designed by Edward Larrabee Barnes and John MY Lee Associates, the 2007 winner of the American Institute of Architects Gold Medal. The construction of the building spanned in stages over a decade.

The museum collection is made up of more than 24,000 objects, dating from the third millennium BC to the present day. It is known for its dynamic exhibition policy and educational programs. The Mildred R. and Frederick M. Mayer Library (the museum's non-circulating research library) contains over 50,000 volumes available to curators and the general public. With  of exhibition spaces, it is one of the largest art museums in the United States.

History

The museum's history began with the establishment in 1903 of the Dallas Art Association, which initially exhibited paintings in the Dallas Public Library. Frank Reaugh, a Texas artist, saw in the new library the opportunity to display works of art. This idea was championed by May Dickson Exall, who was the first president of the Dallas Public Library. Her intention was the following: “to offer art interest and education through exhibitions and lectures, to form a permanent collection, to sponsor the work of local artists, to solicit support of the arts from individuals and businesses, and to honor citizens who support the arts.”

The museum's collections started growing from this moment on. It soon became necessary to find a new permanent home. The museum, renamed the Dallas Museum of Fine Arts in 1932, relocated to a new art deco facility within Fair Park in 1936, on the occasion of the Texas Centennial Exposition.  This new facility was designed by a consortium of Dallas architects in consultation with Paul Cret of Philadelphia. It is still possible to visit this building.

In 1943, Jerry Bywaters, artist and Professor at Southern Methodist University, became the director of the museum, a position he held for the next twenty-one years. Bywaters gave a sense of identity and community to the museum, acquired impressionist, abstract, and contemporary masterpieces were acquired, emphasized the Texas identity of the museum was emphasized. This identity is today represented by works by Alexandre Hogue, Olin Herman Travis, Bywaters himself, and others.

The 1950s proved a tumultuous time for the DMA and Bywaters, as a local movement arose to purge the museum of pieces by "communist" artists, such as Pablo Picasso, whose work was banned.

In 1963, the Dallas Museum of Fine Arts merged with the Dallas Museum of Contemporary Art, whose director for the previous four years had been Douglas MacAgy. In 1964 Merrill C. Rueppel became the director of the newly merged Museum. The permanent collections of the two museums were then housed within the DMFA facility, suddenly holding significant works by Paul Gauguin, Odilon Redon, Henri Matisse, Piet Mondrian, Gerald Murphy, and Francis Bacon. In 1965, the museum held an exhibition called The Art of Piet Mondrian and one entitled Sculpture: Twentieth Century.

By the late 1970s, the greatly enlarged permanent collection and the ambitious exhibition program fostered a need for a new museum facility. Under Harry Parker's direction, the museum was able to move once again, to its current venue, at the northern edge of the city's business district (the now designated Dallas Arts District). The $54 million facility, designed by New York architect Edward Larrabee Barnes, was financed by a 1979 City bond election, together with private donations. The project was galvanized by the slogan “A Great City Deserves a Great Museum,” and the new building opened in January 1984.

The DMA is part of the Monuments Men and Women Museum Network, launched in 2021 by the Monuments Men Foundation for the Preservation of Art.

On June 1 of 2022, a man named Brian Hernandez broke into the museum by using a metal chair to smash through the museum's front entrance. He damaged four pieces of art, including three ancient Greek vases that were over 2,000 years old. The other item damaged was a  ceramic bottle in the shape of a gar fish created by Native American artist.

Collections
The museum's collections include more than 24,000 works of art from around the world ranging from ancient to modern times. They are conceived as a celebration of the human power of creation.

African
Objects in the museum's African collection come from West Africa and Central Africa. The objects date primarily from the 16th to the 20th centuries, although the earliest object is a Nok terracotta bust from Nigeria that dates from somewhere between 200 BC to 200 AD. Some works in the collection were created as symbols of leadership and status, while others express concepts related to the cycle of life.  Highlights of the collection include a Benin plaque of copper alloy over wood depicting a warrior chief, a carved wood Senufo rhythm pounder from southeastern Mali, and a Congo standing power figure studded with ritually embedded iron nails or blades.

American
The American art collection includes paintings, sculptures, and works on paper from the United States from the colonial period to World War II, and art from Mexico, and Canada. Among the highlights of the collection are Duck Island (1906) by Childe Hassam, Lighthouse Hill (1927) by Edward Hopper, That Gentleman (1960) by Andrew Wyeth, Bare Tree Trunks with Snow (1946) by Georgia O'Keeffe and Razor and Watch by Gerald Murphy (1924, 1925). One of the most important pieces in the collection is The Icebergs (1861) by Frederic Edwin Church. This painting had long been referred to as a lost masterpiece. The painting was given to the museum in 1979 by Norma and Lamar Hunt. The Dallas Museum of Art also has one of the most thorough collections of Texas art. This is in great part thanks to Jerry Bywaters, director of the DMA from to 1943 to 1964, who was also one of the Dallas Nine, an influential group of Texas artists. In addition to paintings by Bywaters, the DMA has works by Robert Jenkins Onderdonk, Julian Onderdonk, Alexandre Hogue, Clara McDonald Williamson, David Bates, Dorothy Austin, Michael Owen, and Olin Herman Travis.

Ancient Mediterranean
The Dallas Museum of Art collection of Ancient Mediterranean art includes Cycladic, Egyptian, Greek, Roman, Etruscan, and Apulian objects. Highlights of Egyptian art include a painted limestone Relief of a Procession of Offering Bearers from the Tomb of Ny-Ank-Nesut from 2575 to 2134 BC. The more extensive Greek collection includes a marble Figure of a man from a funerary relief from 300 BC, bronze sculptures, decorative objects, and gold jewelry. The art of ancient Rome is represented by a Figure of a woman from the 2nd century AD and a marble sarcophagus carved in high relief with a battle scene, c. 190 AD.

Asian
The museum's collections of South Asian art range from Gandharan Buddhist art of the 2nd to 4th centuries AD to the arts of the Mughal Empire in India from the 15th to the 19th century. Highlights include a 12th-century bronze Shiva Nataraja and a 10th-century sandstone representation of the god Vishnu as the boar-headed Varaha. The arts of Tibet, Nepal, and Thailand are also represented.

Contemporary
Many important artistic trends since 1945 are represented in the museum's vast collection of contemporary art, from abstract expressionism to pop and op Art, and from minimalism, and conceptualism to installation art, assemblage, and video art. Contemporary artists within the collection whose reputations are well established include Jackson Pollock, Mark Rothko, Franz Kline, Jasper Johns, Robert Rauschenberg, Bruce Nauman, and Robert Smithson. Among photographers represented in the collection are Cindy Sherman, Nic Nicosia, Thomas Struth, and Lynn Davis. When the current Museum facility opened in the mid-1980s, several artists were commissioned to create site-specific works especially for the Dallas Museum of Art: Ellsworth Kelly, Sol LeWitt, Richard Fleischner, and Claes Oldenburg with Coosje van Bruggen. In recent years, the museum has shown a strong interest in collecting the work of contemporary German artists such as Gerhard Richter, Sigmar Polke, and Anselm Kiefer.

Decorative Arts and Design
The expansive collections of Decorative Arts and Design feature over 8,000 works mostly from Europe and America in various media including furniture, ceramics, glass, textiles, and metalware. Among the earliest works in the collection are 16th-century Spanish textiles, 17th century Chinese export porcelain, and European metalware, including the Hoblitzelle Collection of English and Irish silver. Two exceptional early silver objects are a cup and cover (1742) by silversmith Paul de Lamerie and a massive wine cistern (1761–62) by Abraham Portal for Francis Hastings, the 10th Earl of Huntingdon.  American 18th-century furniture forms the core of the Faith P. and Charles L. Bybee Collection, featuring seating and case pieces from Boston, Connecticut, New York, Philadelphia and other regions. The internationally renowned 19th- and 20th-century American silver collection is among the very finest of its type, with major examples by the leading firms of the last two centuries including Tiffany & Co., Gorham Manufacturing Company, Reed & Barton, and International Silver Co. In addition to a unique solid silver dressing table (1899) made by Gorham for the Paris Exposition Universelle of 1900 other highlights include a Gothic revival bed (c.1844) made for Henry Clay, a Herter Brothers sideboard (c. 1881–82) for William Henry Vanderbilt, a pair of Louis Comfort Tiffany stained glass windows (c.1885-95) depicting an undersea scene and a collection of Arts and Crafts movement and early modern designs by Gustav Stickley, Charles Rohlfs, Christopher Dresser, Louis Majorelle, Frank Lloyd Wright and others. The contemporary design holdings include exceptional works by Ettore Sottsass, Zaha Hadid, Richard Meier, the Campana brothers, and a newly formed collection of jewelry.

Since 2014 is Carl Otto Czeschka's solid silver "Wittgenstein-Vitrine" a new exquisite part of the DMA-collections (1908, Wiener Werkstätte).

European
The Dallas Museum of Art's collection of European art starts in the 16th century. Some of the earlier works include paintings by Giulio Cesare Procaccini (Ecce Homo, 1615–18), Pietro Paolini (Bacchic Concert, 1630), and Nicolas Mignard (The Shepherd Faustulus Bringing Romulus and Remus to His Wife, 1654). Art of the 18th century is represented by artists like Canaletto (A View from the Fondamenta Nuova, 1772), Jean-Baptiste Marie Pierre (The Abduction of Europa, 1750), and Claude-Joseph Vernet (Mountain Landscape with Approaching Storm, 1775), Guillaume Lethière, Erminia and the Sheperds, 1795.

The loan of the Michael L. Rosenberg collection brings an added depth to the museum's 18th-century French collection. The 19th and beginning of the 20th century collection of French art also stands out. Among significant works in this collection are Silence by sculptor Auguste Preault, Fox in the Snow by Gustave Courbet (1860), The Seine at Lavacourt by Claude Monet (1880), I Raro te Oviri by Paul Gauguin (1891), Interior (1902), Les Marroniers ou le Vitrail (1894) by Édouard Vuillard, and The Harbor (Le Port), 1912, by Jean Metzinger.

A growing collection of 19th and 20th century European paintings from Denmark, Fredericksborg by Moonlight Johan Christian Dahl, Belgium, Abundance by Léon Frédéric, Germany Italian Landscape by Hans Thoma, and Swiss The Halberdier by Ferdinand Hodler, offers a more comprehensive view of the art scene for this period. The sculpture collection from the first part of the 20th century includes important works such as Constructed Head n°2 by Naum Gabo, Three men Walking by Alberto Giacometti, 1936, White Relief by Ben Nicholson, and Beginning of the World by Constantin Brâncuși (1920). The collection of works by Piet Mondrian is noteworthy, with works like The Windmill (1908), Self-Portrait (1942), and Place de la Concorde (1938–43).

Pre-Columbian/Pacific Rim
The museum has significant holdings of ancient American art. The collection covers more than three millennia, displaying sculptures, prints, terracotta, and gold objects. Among the other highlights are gold objects from Panama, Colombia and Peru and the Head of the god Tlaloc (Mexico, 14th-16th century).

Wendy and Emery Reves Collection
The Wendy and Emery Reves Collection. In 1985 the Dallas Museum of Art received a gift from Wendy Reves in honor of her late husband, the publisher Emery Reves. The Reves collection is housed in an elaborate 15,000-square-foot (1,400 m2) reproduction of the couple' home in France, the Villa La Pausa, where the works were originally displayed in situ. La Pausa was built by the fashion designer Coco Chanel in 1927, and some of the original furniture is kept in its context. Among the 1,400 paintings, sculptures, and works on paper Emery Reves had collected are works from leading impressionist, post-impressionist, and early modernist artists, including Paul Cézanne, Honoré Daumier, Edgar Degas, Paul Gauguin, Édouard Manet, Claude Monet, Camille Pissarro, Auguste Renoir, Henri de Toulouse-Lautrec, and Vincent van Gogh. An extremely fine collection of Auguste Rodin sculptures include very fine bronze casts, rare marble like the first version of the Sirens, a unique piece The poet and contemplative life from the Fenaille family, and even an unusual original wax piece. An extensive accompanying collection of decorative arts works includes Chinese export porcelain; European furniture; Oriental and European carpets; iron, bronze, and silver work; European glass; and rare books. Memorabilia of the Reves' friendship with English statesman Winston Churchill, a frequent guest at La Pausa, is housed in the wing as well.

Exhibitions 
Contemporary Art + Design features many works from a variety of media including, drawing painting, installations, jewelry, and design objects. The Exhibition is available from August 30, 2020, to March 7, 2021, and is a free exhibition. The work is from over 11 countries and the forms display the unique shapes of the functional and experiential sculptures.

Cindy Sherman's Exhibition took place from March 7, 2013, to June 9, 2013. the retrospective survey traced Sherman's career from the mid 70s to the present, at the time of the exhibition. She is one of the most widely recognized as an important contemporary artist. The exhibition showed work from undergrad to photographic murals.

Dior: From Paris to the World began May 19, 2019, and ended on October 27th, 2019. Christian Dior was showcased in the exhibition along with his successors including Yves Saint Laurent, Marc Bohan, Gianfranco Ferré, John Galliano, Raf Simons, and Maria Grazia Chiuri. The exhibition consisted of 200 haute couture dresses, accessories, photographs, sketches, and runway videos.

Community events

In 2008, the museum premiered the Center for Creative Connections (also known as C3), a  facility for interactive learning experiences. The center presents exhibitions featuring the museum's collections and artists’ and community partners’ responses to them. Spaces include the Art Studio, Tech Lab, Theater, and Arturo's Nest.

The museum also hosts numerous community outreach programs throughout the year, including:
 Late Nights: once a month the museum is open until midnight with performances, concerts, readings, film screenings, tours and family programs.
 Arts & Letters Live: a lecture series featuring acclaimed authors, actors, illustrators, and musicians.
 Thursday Night Live: every Thursday evening there are live jazz concerts, dinner and drinks in the cafe, and artist encounters in the Center for Creative Connections.

Management
In 2013, the Dallas Museum of Art instituted free admission and a free membership program.

In September 2015, Maxwell Anderson stepped down as director, and was succeeded by Walter Elcock, president of the DMA's board.

Collection highlights: paintings and sculpture

More collection highlights

See also
American Art Collaborative
Arts District, Dallas, Texas
Nasher Sculpture Center
Trammell & Margaret Crow Collection of Asian Art
List of buildings and structures in Dallas, Texas
Statue of Laxmi-Narayan

Bibliography
Dallas Museum of Art 100 Years, Dorothy Kosinski with Lauren Schell (2003)
Dallas Museum of Art, A Guide to the Collection, Managing Editor: Debra Wittrup (1997)
https://www.dma.org/about/museum-history
 Kevin W. Tucker, Elisabeth Schmuttermeier, Fran Baas: The Wittgenstein-Vitrine - Modern Opulence in Vienna, New Haven and London, 2016

References

External links
Dallas Museum of Art
Virtual tour of the Dallas Museum of Art provided by Google Arts & Culture

	

Arts in Dallas
Museums in Dallas
Art museums and galleries in Texas
Downtown Dallas
Museums of American art
Museums of ancient Greece in the United States
Museums of ancient Rome in the United States
Asian art museums in the United States
Mesoamerican art museums in the United States
FRAME Museums
Art museums established in 1903
1903 establishments in Texas
Institutions accredited by the American Alliance of Museums
Edward Larrabee Barnes buildings
African art museums in the United States